Erling Wold (born  January 30, 1958 in Burbank, California) is a San Francisco based composer of  opera and contemporary classical music. He is best known for his later chamber operas, and his early experiments as a microtonalist.

Life

Wold was born into a religious family, the son of Erling Henry Wold Sr, a Lutheran minister and Margaret Barth Wold, an author of inspirational books and plays.  He was given piano lessons at an early age but showed little interest in music until his teen years, when he became infatuated, teaching himself to play a variety of instruments and embracing the music of many of the modernist composers. It was also at this point that he started to write music. He first studied composition at Occidental College with Robert Gross where he was awarded the Elinor Remick Warren Composition Award in 1978.  Later teachers included Gerard Grisey, Andrew Imbrie and John Chowning at the University of California, Berkeley and Stanford University, where he primarily studied computer music, gaining a facility with the mathematics of signal processing.  While at Berkeley, he married Lynn Murdock, for whom he wrote a number of his early works.  In 1985, they had a son, Duncan Renaldo Wold.  He married the painter Lynne Rutter in 2010.

After earning his doctorate at Berkeley in 1987, he went to work for Yamaha Music Technologies, writing a number of patents in music synthesis and processing. During this period, most of his music was electronic, and he was an early advocate of the Synclavier. His work at this time with a number of San Francisco performance artists and dancers led to his continuing interest in theater. After leaving Yamaha in 1992, he cofounded Muscle Fish, an audio and music software company. By 1995 he had migrated back to writing instrumental music and wrote his first chamber opera based on Max Ernst's collage novel A Little Girl Dreams of Taking the Veil, a critical and popular success which has been revived several times, including performances by the Paul Dresher Ensemble and by the Klagenfurter ensemble in Austria and Germany. The success of the production led to a residency at ODC Theater in San Francisco, where he premiered his opera Queer based on William S. Burroughs' early autobiographical novel of the same name in 2001 and Sub Pontio Pilato, an historical fantasy on the death and remembrance of Pontius Pilate in 2003.  There have been few purely musical works during this period, but some notable exceptions are Close, played by Relâche and others, the piano pieces Albrechts Fluegel, premiered by Finnish pianist Marja Mutru, and Veracity.

Although he rejected religion in his teens, he has returned many times to religious themes in his works, including many of his operatic works, and his Mass  named for Notker the Stammerer commissioned by the Cathedral of St Gall.  His earliest music was atonal and arrhythmic, but the influences of just intonation and the music of the minimalists led to the bulk of his music being composed in a variety of tonal genres.  He was attracted by the theater and much of his music is either directly dramatic or is based on dramatic rather than purely musical structures. Wold is an eclectic composer who has also been called "the Eric Satie of Berkeley surrealist/minimalist electro-art rock" by the Village Voice. He composed the soundtracks for a number of films by the independent film director Jon Jost.

There are a number of CD and DVD releases of Wold's music. He has published artistic and technical articles in several publications, including the Leonardo Music Journal, IEEE MultiMedia, Proceedings of the International Computer Music Conference, SIGGRAPH, the Just Intonation Network Journal 1/1, IEEE Transactions on Computers and several books.

He is the Executive Director of the San Francisco Composers Chamber Orchestra.

Discography

 Rattensturm (2019). On Spooky Pooch. Conducted by Alexei Kornienko. 
 UKSUS (2019). On MinMax. Performed by Timur Bekbosunov et al, conducted by Bryan Nies. 
 Certitude and Joy (2014). On MinMax. Performed by Laura Bohn et al., and the ZOFO Duet. 
 Mordake (2010). On MinMax. Performed by John Duykers, and the SFCCO under Mark Alburger.
 Missa Beati Notkeri Balbuli Sancti Galli Monachi (2010). On Spooky Pooch Records. Recorded at the Abbey of Saint Gall under the direction of Hans Eberhard, with Kimberly Brockman, soprano.
 Sub Pontio Pilato (2006), a live performance at ODC Theater, with Jonathan Khuner conducting, starring John Duykers. On Spooky Pooch Records. 
 queer (2002). Conducted by Dierdre McClure with Trauma Flintstone in the lead role. On Spooky Pooch Records. 
 A Little Girl Dreams of Taking the Veil (2001). Conducted by Dierdre McClure, presented by ODC Theater. On MinMax.
 The Bed You Sleep In (1992). Soundtrack for a movie by Jon Jost. On Table of the Elements.
 I Weep (1992). On Spooky Pooch.
 Music of Love (1987). For microtonal Synclavier. On Spooky Pooch.

Works

Chamber Opera
 Rattensturm (2018) on the sinking of the SMS Szent István, libretto by Peter Wagner.
 Uksus (2012-2016) based on the writings of Daniil Kharms.
 Certitude and Joy (2012)  on the dangers and ecstasies of religious faith.
 Mordake (2008) a solo opera for John Duykers on the story of Edward Mordake; libretto by Douglas Kearney.
 Blinde Liebe (2005) an interactive dance opera on a true crime story
Sub Pontio Pilato (2003)  an historical fantasy on Pontius Pilate with libretto by James Bisso
 die Nacht wird kommen... (2002) a German language version of A Little Girl Dreams of Taking the Veil
queer (2000, revised 2011)  based on the novel by William S. Burroughs
 A Little Girl Dreams of Taking the Veil (1995, revised 2000) based on Max Ernst's collage novel

Dance
 Trio (2004) a joint composition with Thom Blum for Deborah Slater Dance Theater
 i brought my hips to the table (1998) text by Michelle Murphy
 Abstaende (1995) dance by Palindrome Dance Company
 Egg (1990) - dance by Gay White
 Crash (1987)
 Dance of the Testifiers (1987)
 Dance of the Polygamists (1987)

Orchestra
 Certitude and Joy (2011) commissioned and premiered by the Sofia Symphonic Orchestra
 Brightness (2004) for clarinet and orchestra, premiered by Rachel Condry.

Choral
 Missa Beati Notkeri Balbuli Sancti Galli Monachi (2006)

Chamber
 walking along the embarcadero past pier 7 and the flowers (2011) for two pianos
 Veracity (2001) for piano
 Close (1997) for chamber ensemble
 Albrechts Fluegel (1995) for piano
 Seven Days Ago (1990)
 It was in the summer that I first noticed your hair, your face, your eyelids (1988)

Film
 Coyotes Kill For Fun (2017) film by Blake Eckard
 Bubba Moon Face (2011) film by Blake Eckard
 La Lunga Ombra (2005) film by Jon Jost
 Homecoming (2004) film by Jon Jost
 London Brief (1997) film by Jon Jost
 The Bed You Sleep In (1993) film by Jon Jost
 Sure Fire (1990) film by Jon Jost

Songs
 Raheel (2003) text by Dima Hilal
 Harvest of Rage (2000) songs for tenor and orchestra
 13 Versions of Surrender (1996) text by Michelle Murphy
 Center Mother and Boss Puss (1990) text by Antonin Artaud

References

External links
 ErlingWold.com website

American male classical composers
American classical composers
20th-century classical composers
21st-century classical composers
American opera composers
Male opera composers
1958 births
Living people
Musicians from the San Francisco Bay Area
California Institute of Technology alumni
Occidental College alumni
University of California, Berkeley alumni
Stanford University alumni
Pupils of Gérard Grisey
Musicians from Burbank, California
21st-century American composers
20th-century American composers
Classical musicians from California
20th-century American male musicians
21st-century American male musicians